Bromelia karatas is a plant species in the genus Bromelia. This species is native to West Indies and to Latin America from San Luis Potosí + Sinaloa south to Brazil.

References

karatas
Flora of South America
Flora of Mexico
Flora of Central America
Flora of the Caribbean
Plants described in 1753
Taxa named by Carl Linnaeus
Flora without expected TNC conservation status